The African Youth Athletics Championships is a biennial continental athletics competition for African athletes, organised by the Confederation of African Athletics. First held in 2013, it is a youth category event open to athletes aged fifteen to seventeen in the year of competition.

The competition was the third continental athletics competition to be created for that age level, following in the steps of the South American and Oceanian events. Its proposal, coming at a similar time as that for the European Athletics Youth Championships, marked a growing interest in international competition for younger people.

Editions

Championships records

Boys

Girls

References
General
CAA: African U18 Championships Records 20 April 2019 updated
Specific

External links 
 Confederation of African Athletics website
 African Youth Championships Records – Men
 African Youth Championships Records – Women

 
Continental athletics championships
Youth
Under-18 athletics competitions
Recurring sporting events established in 2013
Biennial athletics competitions